Barbora Krejčíková defeated Anastasia Pavlyuchenkova in the final, 6–1, 2–6, 6–4 to win the women's singles tennis title at the 2021 French Open.
It was her first major singles title.
Krejčíková saved a match point en route to the title, in the semifinals against Maria Sakkari, making her the first player since Justine Henin in 2005 and the third woman in the Open Era to win the French Open after saving a match point. Krejčíková and Pavlyuchenkova were the combined lowest ranked major finalists (numbers 33 and 32, respectively) since the introduction of computer rankings began in 1975.

Krejčíková became the first Czech woman to win the title since Hana Mandlíková in 1981. She also became the first player to win both the singles and doubles titles at the same major since Serena Williams at the 2016 Wimbledon Championships, and the first to do so at the French Open since Mary Pierce in 2000. Pavlyuchenkova reached her maiden major final after participating in 52 major main draws, breaking the record previously set by Flavia Pennetta in 2015.

Iga Świątek was the defending champion, but lost to Sakkari in the quarterfinals. Świątek's loss marked the 14th consecutive year where the reigning French Open champion failed to defend her title, with Henin being the last woman to do so in 2007. It also ensured the sixth consecutive French Open to feature a first-time major champion. Świątek's loss also ensured that this was the first French Open and the third major in the Open Era to feature all first-time major semifinalists, and it was the first major in the Open Era in which six players made their major quarterfinal debuts.

Ashleigh Barty and Naomi Osaka were in contention for the WTA No. 1 singles ranking. Barty retained the top ranking after Osaka withdrew from the second round.

Serena Williams became the oldest woman in the Open Era to reach the fourth round; this was also the three-time former champion's final French Open appearance before retiring from professional tennis the following year. Sakkari and Tamara Zidanšek became the first Greek woman and Slovenian player to reach the singles quarterfinals and semifinals of a major, respectively. Coco Gauff became the youngest player to reach a major quarterfinal since Nicole Vaidišová at the 2006 French Open.

Seeds

Draw

Finals

Top half

Section 1

Section 2

Section 3

Section 4

Bottom half

Section 5

Section 6

Section 7

Section 8

Championship match statistics

Seeded players
The following are the seeded players. Seedings are based on WTA rankings as of 24 May 2021. Rankings and points before are as of 31 May 2021. Because the tournament was moved a week and points of the week of 10 June 2019 includes results only from Nottingham. The defending points from 's-Hertogenbosch is not included towards on dropping points.

As a result of pandemic-related adjustments to the ranking system and changes to the WTA Tour calendar in 2020, players will have the following potential adjustments to their ranking points after the tournament:
 Players who are defending points from the 2019 tournament in which are higher will be dropped on 14 June 2021; those points will be replaced by the higher of their points from 2019 or 2020 (points from 2020 will still be valid at the end of the 2021 tournament because the 2020 tournament delayed to four months in the normal scheduled calendar year; both 2019 and 2020 points are equaled within the same result will also be dropped on 11 October 2021).
 Players who are defending points from the 2020 tournament will have those points replaced by 2021 points only if the latter are higher.
 Players who have points from the 2020 tournament still counting towards their ranking on 14 June 2021 will have those points dropped on 11 October 2021 (52 weeks after the 2020 tournament); any 2020 points will be replaced by 2021 points at that time.
 Players who are not defending points from either the 2019 or 2020 tournaments will have their 16th best result replaced by their points from the 2021 tournament.

Note that this is a different ranking adjustment system than the one being used by the ATP for the men's event. 

†The player's 2019 points will be replaced by (or the player will continue to count) her 2020 points, which will be dropped on 11 October 2021, four months after the end of the 2021 tournament.
§The player did not qualify for the tournament in 2019. Accordingly, points from her 16th best result are deducted instead.

Withdrawn players 
The following players would have been seeded, but withdrew before the tournament began.

Other entry information

Wildcards
The following players were awarded wildcards into the main draw.

Protected ranking

Qualifiers

Lucky losers

Withdrawals
Before the tournament

 – not included on entry list& – withdrew from entry list

During the tournament

Retirements

Notes

References

External links 
Main draw
2021 French Open – Women's draws at the Roland Garros
2021 French Open – Women's draws at the International Tennis Federation

Women's Singles
French Open by year – Women's singles
French Open – Women's singles